KVAT-LD, virtual channel 17 (UHF digital channel 35), is a low-powered television station serving Austin, Texas, United States that is licensed to Garfield. The station is owned by HC2 Holdings.

History
The license was initially established in 1978 as translator K63AY by Pompey Mountain Broadcasting in Mullin. It was displaced to channel 17 as K17GH.

The station was originally an affiliate of LAT TV, a Houston-based Spanish-language television network that launched in May 2006; however, the network folded 2 years later in 2008.

In December 2010, the station's call letters changed from KVAT-LP to KVAT-LD.

In June 2013, KVAT-LD was slated to be sold to Landover 5 LLC as part of a larger deal involving 51 other low-power television stations; the sale fell through in June 2016. Mako Communications sold its stations, including KVAT-LD, to HC2 Holdings in 2017.

Digital channels
The station's digital signal is multiplexed:

References

External links

Television stations in Texas
Television channels and stations established in 2006
Low-power television stations in the United States
Innovate Corp.